Agioi Theodoroi (Greek: Άγιοι Θεόδωροι) is a small hamlet in the community and municipal unit of Lechaina, Greece. The village is situated 6 km east of Lechaina proper, on the road to Melissa and Borsi.

Population

External links
GTP - Agioi Theodoroi

See also

List of settlements in Elis

References 

Lechaina
Populated places in Elis